Saadi Toma Abbas (17 March 1939 – 23 June 2020) was a former Iraqi military and politician. He was born in 1939 and held various ministerial positions during the rule of Saddam Hussein. 

On 12 December 1990, he was appointed as Ministry of Defence and remained in office until 6 April 1991. He worked as military advisor at the Presidential Court from 6 April 1991 to 1998. In 1998 he was appointed Minister of Labor and Social Affairs and remained in his position until 29 June 2002. 

He was arrested by the American forces in 18 May 2003.

Trial
On 2 December 2008, the Iraqi Supreme Criminal Court sentenced him to 15 years in prison for suppressing the 1991 uprising in Iraq while he was serving as commander of the military forces in the southern region.

Death
He died in the Al-Hout prison in Dhi Qar on 23 June 2020.

References

2020 deaths
Government ministers of Iraq
Iraqi military personnel of the Iran–Iraq War
Prisoners who died in Iraqi detention
Iraqi people who died in prison custody